The following lists events that happened during 1937 in the Union of Soviet Socialist Republics.

Incumbents
 General Secretary of the Communist Party of the Soviet Union – Joseph Stalin
 Chairman of the Central Executive Committee of the Congress of Soviets – Mikhail Kalinin
 Chairman of the Council of People's Commissars of the Soviet Union – Vyacheslav Molotov

Events
 23–30 January – Trial of the Anti-Soviet Trotskyist Center
 June – Case of Trotskyist Anti-Soviet Military Organization
 18-20 June -  by the crew led by Valery Chkalov
 12–14 July – A world-record non-stop , by the crew led by Mikhail Gromov, from Moscow to San Jacinto, California
 12 December – Soviet Union legislative election, 1937

Films
 Bezhin Meadow – directed by Sergei Eisenstein
 Lullaby – directed by Dziga Vertov
 The Return of Maxim – directed by Grigori Kozintsev and Leonid Trauberg
 Without Dowry – directed by Yakov Protazanov

Births
 16 February – Yuri Manin, mathematician (died 2023)
 7 July – Valery Anisimov, wrestler
 September – Valentina Dimitrieva, farm worker (died 2019)

Deaths
 10 January – Martemyan Ryutin
 30 January – Georgy Pyatakov and Nikolay Muralov
 18 February – Grigory Ordzhonikidze
 April 13 – Ilya Ilf
 31 May – Yan Gamarnik and Nikolai Uglanov
 night of 11/12 June – Mikhail Tukhachevsky, Ieronim Uborevich, Iona Yakir, Vitovt Putna, Vitaly Primakov and Robert Eideman
 July 13 – Mikhail Alafusov
 October 30 – Avel Enukidze
 November 26 – Leonid Veyner
 November 28 – Ernest Appoga
 Vassily Ryutin, older son of Martemyan Ryutin, executed (born 1910)
 Vissarion Ryutin, younger son of Martemyan Ryutin, executed (born 1913)

See also
 1937 in fine arts of the Soviet Union
 List of Soviet films of 1937

 
1930s in the Soviet Union